Aisha Brown is a Canadian stand-up comedian and actress. She is most noted for her 2020 comedy special Aisha Brown: The First Black Woman Ever, which was the first Crave Original comedy special ever taped by a Black Canadian comedian.

The special received three Canadian Screen Award nominations at the 9th Canadian Screen Awards in 2021, including Best Variety or Entertainment Special and Best Writing in a Variety or Sketch Comedy Program or Series. She also received a second nomination in the latter category as a member of the writing team for This Hour Has 22 Minutes.

As an actress, she has appeared in sketches on The Beaverton and Baroness von Sketch Show, and in the comedy series Humour Resources.

References

External links

21st-century Canadian actresses
21st-century Canadian comedians
Canadian stand-up comedians
Canadian women comedians
Canadian television actresses
Canadian television writers
Black Canadian actresses
Living people
Black Canadian comedians
Year of birth missing (living people)
Canadian women television writers